List of the largest cargo airports in the United States based on weight of landed cargo in US Pounds (freight + mail) since 2008 (note: this list includes airports in U.S. territories).

See also
List of busiest airports in the world by cargo traffic
List of the busiest airports
List of busiest airports by passenger traffic

References

United States, Cargo